Holland Fen is a settlement in the Borough of Boston, Lincolnshire, England.

History

Holland Fen has been known as the Haute Huntre, or Eight Hundred Fen.

In 1720 Earl Fitzwilliam decided to drain the Holland Fen, having been frustrated by the local Commissioners of Sewers. He built the North Forty Foot Drain, which emptied by Lodowicks Gowt into the River Witham above Grand Sluice. The North Forty Foot was subsequently diverted to the South Forty Foot Drain at Cooks Lock and from there to Boston Haven through Black Sluice.

The Haute Huntre was drained and enclosed in 1767.

Holland Fen was an ecclesiastical parish created in 1812 and abolished in 1948. It is now part of the Holland Fen with Brothertoft parish.

Holland Fen consists of:
Holland Fen
Ferry Corner Plot
River Bottom
North Forty Foot Bank
Hedgehog Bridge
Toft Tunnel

Church

The church is dedicated to All Saints and was built as a chapel of ease to Fosdyke in 1812. It was constructed of brick in Perpendicular style, with chancel and nave only, and bell turret. In 1964 Pevsner noted a chancel dated 1880, a west gallery on iron shafts, a pulpit with fluted pilasters, and a chalice probably by William Bell.

Today, All Saints' Church is part of the Holland Fen with Brothertoft Group, also known as "Five in the Fen" which also includes:

Saint Gilbert Of Sempringham, Brothertoft
Christ Church, Kirton Holme
Saint Margaret of Scotland, Langrick
Saint Peter, Wildmore

References

External links

Villages in Lincolnshire